The 2002 Ipswich Borough Council election was an election for Ipswich Borough Council held on 2 May 2002. The whole council was up for election with boundary changes since the last election in 2000. The Labour Party kept overall control of the council.

Election result

Ward results

Alexandra

Bixley

Bridge

Castle Hill

Gainsborough

Gipping

Holywells

Priory Heath

Rushmere

St Johns

St Margaret's

Sprites

Stoke Park

Westgate

Whitehouse

Whitton

References
2002 Ipswich election result
Ipswich Borough Council
Election Results
1973-2012]

2002 English local elections
2002
2000s in Suffolk